A by-election was held in the Baegu/Asifola constituency in the Solomon Islands on 30 March 2011. The election followed the death of MP Toswel Kaua, an Independent, who had first won the seat in April 2006, and held it in the August 2010 general election.

David Tome won the by-election with 1,366 votes, amounting to 21.4% of valid votes cast. Henry Ologa Olebeni came second with 1,117 votes.

Results

See also
 List of Solomon Islands by-elections

References

2011
2011 in the Solomon Islands
Solomon Islands